There and Back Again is the second album, and first studio album, by Phil Lesh and Friends.  It was released by Columbia Records in 2002.

Track listing
"Celebration" (Lesh, Hunter)
"Night of a Thousand Stars" (Lesh, Haynes, Hunter)
"The Real Thing" (Haynes)
"Again and Again" (Herring, Hunter)
"No More Do I" (Lesh, Hunter)
"Patchwork Quilt" (Haynes)
"Liberty" (Garcia, Hunter)
"Midnight Train" (Lesh)
"Leave Me Out of This" (Barraco, Mattson)
"Welcome to the Underground" (Haynes)
"Rock-n-Roll Blues" (Lesh, Hunter)

Personnel
Phil Lesh – bass, vocals
Warren Haynes – guitar, vocals
Jimmy Herring – guitar
John Molo – drums and percussion
Rob Barraco – keyboards, vocals
Michael Kang – violin on "Rock-n-Roll Blues"

Limited edition
There and Back Again was released in two different versions, the regular album, and a Limited Edition album.  The Limited Edition includes a second CD that is 52:14 long and that contains studio and live performances of four more songs.

"Passenger" (Lesh, Monk) – recorded at The Plant, Sausalito, California
"St. Stephen" (Garcia, Hunter, Lesh) – 4/4/02, Denver, Colorado, with Derek Trucks
"Dark Star" (Garcia, Hunter, Lesh, Weir, Kreutzmann, McKernan) – 12/31/01, Oakland, California, with Derek Trucks
"The Eleven" (Lesh, Hunter) – 3/30/02, San Francisco, California

References

Phil Lesh albums
2002 albums
Albums produced by Don Gehman
Columbia Records albums